Steven Klein or Kline may refer to:

Sports
Steve Kline (left-handed pitcher) (born 1972), MLB pitcher
Steve Kline (right-handed pitcher) (1947–2018), MLB pitcher
Steve Klein (soccer) (born 1975), American soccer player

Others
Steve Klein (musician) (born 1979), American musician
Steven Klein (artist) (born 1965), American photographer
Steven A. Klein (born 1959), CEO of Burlen Co.
Steve Klein, producer of Innocence of Muslims
 Steven Klein (producer), Film producer